The Basilica of Our Lady of the Martyrs  Is a Catholic church located on Rua Garrett, in Chiado, Lisbon, Portugal in the parish of St Mary (in the territory of the old parish of the Martyrs). Made in the baroque and late neoclassical style, it is an example of the quality of religious architecture in the context of the Pombaline rearrangement of Lisbon.

The parish of Our Lady of the Martyrs was created immediately after the reconquest of Lisbon to the Moors in 1147, which has its origin in a small chapel built to be able to house the image of the Virgin brought by English crusaders, Was called by people as Our Lady of the Martyrs in memory of all the soldiers who died in combat in defence of the Christian faith. According to tradition, D. Afonso Henriques requested the help and protection of the Virgin, and in it, the first baptism was made in the city after the Reconquest.

The hermitage was already a large baroque church in 1755 when it was completely destroyed during the earthquake that hit Lisbon that year. The current basilica was designed by Reinaldo Manuel dos Santos, after having been dedicated by the religious authorities in March 1784.

See also
Roman Catholicism in Portugal
National Shrine of the North American Martyrs

References

Basilica churches in Portugal
Roman Catholic churches in Lisbon
Roman Catholic churches completed in 1784
18th-century Roman Catholic church buildings in Portugal
Neoclassical church buildings in Portugal